Naseeb Apna Apna may refer to:-

 Naseeb Apna Apna (1970 film)
 Naseeb Apna Apna (1986 film)